St Helen's Church or Church of St Helen may refer to the following churches in England:

 St Helen's Church, Abingdon, Oxfordshire
 St Helen's Church, Ainderby Steeple, North Yorkshire
 St Helen's Church, Ashby-de-la-Zouch, Leicestershire
 St Helen's Church, Barmby on the Marsh
 St Helen's Church, Bishopsgate, London
 St Helen's Church, Brant Broughton
 Church of St Helen, Burghwallis, South Yorkshire
 St Helen's Church, Burton Joyce
 St Helen's Church, Churchtown, Lancashire
 St Helen's Church, Darley Dale
 Church of St Helen, Denton, North Yorkshire
 St Helen's Church, Etwall
 St Helen's Church, Grove
 Church of St Helen and St Giles, Havering, London
 St Helen's Church, Hangleton, Brighton and Hove
 St Helen's Church, Ipswich
 Church of St Helen, Kilnsea, East Riding of Yorkshire
 St Helen's Church, Kneeton
 St Helen's Church, Little Cawthorpe Lincolnshire
 St Helen's Church, Lundy
 St Helen Witton Church, Northwich, Cheshire
 St Helen's Church, Norwich
 St Helen's Church, Overton, Lancashire
 St Helen's Church, Oxendon
 Church of St Helen, Ranworth
 St Helen's Church, Santon
 St Helen's Church, Sefton, Merseyside
 St Helen's Church, Selston
 St Helen's Church, Sibbertoft
 Church of St Helen, St Helen Auckland
 St Helen's Church, St Helens, Isle of Wight
 Church of St Helen, St Helens, Merseyside
 St Helen's Church, Stapleford
 St Helen's Church, Stonegate, York
 St Helen's Church, Tarporley, Cheshire
 St Helen's Church, Thorney
 St Helen's Church, Treeton
 St Helen's Church, Trowell
 St Helen's Church, Waddington, Lancashire
 St Helen's Church, Welton
 St Helen's Church, Westcliff-on-Sea, Essex
 St Helen's Church, Wheathampstead, Hertfordshire
 St Helen's Church, Wheldrake, City of York
 St Helen's Church, Stonegate, York

See also
 Saint Helena's Church (disambiguation)
 St James the Less and St Helen Church, Colchester, Essex, England
 St Mary's and St Helen's Church, Neston, Cheshire, England